Paul  Skenes (born May 29, 2002) is an American college baseball pitcher and catcher for the LSU Tigers.

Early life and amateur career
Skenes grew up in Lake Forest, California and attended El Toro High School. He was recruited by the US Air Force Academy baseball team and accepted an appointment as part of the class of 2024.

In his first season at Air Force, Skenes was named the Mountain West Conference Freshman of the Year and a first team All-American by the Collegiate Baseball Newspaper, Baseball America, and the NCBWA. He was named the winner of the John Olerud Award as the nation's best two-way player.

In 2021, he played collegiate summer baseball with the Wareham Gatemen of the Cape Cod Baseball League.

After his sophomore season, Skenes entered the NCAA transfer portal. On July 28, 2022, Skenes announced via social media that he would be transferring to LSU.

References

External links

Air Force Falcons bio

2002 births
Living people
Baseball players from California
Baseball pitchers
Baseball catchers
Air Force Falcons baseball players
All-American college baseball players
Wareham Gatemen players